Across may refer to:

Technology and engineering
 Across Language Server, a software platform
 ACROSS Project, an R&D project in social robotics
 Suzuki Across (motorcycle), a motorcycle manufactured by Suzuki
 Suzuki Across (crossover), an automobile based on the Toyota RAV4

Other uses
 ACROSS, a fictional secret organization which is the subject of the manga and anime series Excel Saga

See also
 Accross, a short name of Accrington and Rossendale College